Jan Hranáč (born October 26, 1969) is a Czech professional ice hockey defenceman who is currently playing for HKm Zvolen in the Slovak Extraliga.

Career statistics

External links

1969 births
Living people
Czech ice hockey defencemen
HC Lada Togliatti players
HC Litvínov players
HC Most players
HK Nitra players
HK 36 Skalica players
HKM Zvolen players
Orli Znojmo players
Rytíři Kladno players
Sportovní Klub Kadaň players
Czech expatriate ice hockey players in Slovakia
Czech expatriate ice hockey players in Russia